The biological activity of a pesticide, be it chemical or biological in nature, is determined by its active ingredient (AI - also called the active substance). Pesticide products very rarely consist of pure technical material. The AI is usually formulated with other materials and this is the product as sold, but it may be further diluted in use. Formulations improves the properties of a chemical for handling, storage, application and may substantially influence effectiveness and safety.

Formulation terminology follows a 2-letter convention: (e.g. GR: granules) listed by CropLife International (formerly GIFAP then GCPF) in the Catalogue of Pesticide Formulation Types (Monograph 2); see:  download page. Some manufacturers do not follow these industry standards, which can cause confusion for users.

Water-miscible formulations

By far the most frequently used products are formulations for mixing with water then applying as sprays.
Water miscible, older formulations include:
 EC	Emulsifiable concentrate
 WP	Wettable powder
 SL	Soluble (liquid) concentrate
 SP	Soluble powder

Newer, non-powdery formulations with reduced or no use of hazardous solvents and improved stability include:
 SC	Suspension concentrate
 CS	Capsule suspensions
 WG	Water dispersible granules

Other formulations
Other common formulations include granules (GR) and dusts (DP), although for improved safety the latter have been replaced by microgranules (MG e.g. for rice farmers in Japan).  Specialist formulations are available for ultra-low volume spraying, fogging, fumigation, etc. Very occasionally, some pesticides (e.g. malathion) may be sold as technical material (TC - which is mostly AI, but also contains small quantities of, usually non-active, by-products of the manufacturing process).

A particularly efficient form of pesticide dose transfer is seed treatment and specific formulations have been developed for this purpose.  A number of pesticide bait formulations are available for rodent pest control, etc.

In reality many formulation codes are used: AB, AE, AL, AP, BB, BR, CB, CF, CG, CL, CP, CS, DC, DL, DP, DS, DT, EC, ED, EG, EO, ES, EW, FD, FG, FK, FP, FR, FS, FT, FU, FW, GA, GB, GE, GF, GG, GL, GP, GR, GS, GW, HN, KK, KL, KN, KP, LA, LS, LV, MC, ME, MG, MV, OD, OF, OL, OP, PA, PB, PC, PO, PR, PS, RB, SA, SB, SC, SD, SE, SG, SL, SO, SP, SS, ST, SU, TB, TC, TK, TP, UL, VP, WG, WP, WS, WT, XX, ZC, ZE and ZW.

See also 

 Formulations
 Formulation science
 Pharmaceutical formulation
 Galenic formulation

References

Further reading
 Burges, H.D. (ed.) (1998) Formulation of Microbial Biopesticides, beneficial microorganisms, nematodes and seed treatments. Kluwer Academic Press, 412 pp.

Pesticides